The 1935–36 Gauliga was the third season of the Gauliga, the first tier of the football league system in Germany from 1933 to 1945. 

The league operated in sixteen regional divisions, of which two, the Gauliga Ostpreußen and Gauliga Pommern, were sub-divided into four and two regional groups respectively, with the league containing 183 clubs all up, eleven more than the previous season. The  league champions entered the 1936 German football championship, won by 1. FC Nürnberg who defeated Fortuna Düsseldorf 2–1 in the final. It was  Nürnberg's sixth national championship, the club's only one during the Gauliga era of German football from 1933 to 1945.

Three clubs remained unbeaten during the league season: Hindenburg Allenstein, FC Schalke 04 and 1. FC Nürnberg. Of those three Nürnberg would go on to remain unbeaten during the German championship as well while Schalke would suffer two defeats, one of them in the semi-finals to Nürnberg, while Allenstein would lose all six finals games. At the other end of the table only one club finished the season without a win, SpVgg Feuerbach. FC Schalke 04 scored the most goals of any Gauliga club with 94 while SC Dresdenia Dresden conceded the most with 72. FC Schalke 04 achieved the highest points total with 35 while SV Insterburg earned the least with two points to its name.

The 1935–36 season saw the second edition of the Tschammerpokal, now the DFB-Pokal. The 1936 edition was won by VfB Leipzig, defeating FC Schalke 04 2–1 on 3 January 1937.

Champions
The 1935–36 Gauliga champions qualified for the group stage of the German championship. FC Schalke 04, Vorwärts-Rasensport Gleiwitz, Fortuna Düsseldorf and 1. FC Nürnberg won their championship groups and advanced to the semi-finals with the latter two reaching the championship final which  Nürnberg won.

FC Schalke 04 and Eimsbütteler TV both won their third consecutive Gauliga titles while Hertha BSC, FC Hanau 93, SV Jena, PSV Chemnitz and Vorwärts-Rasensport Gleiwitz all won their second consecutive one. SV Waldhof Mannheim, 1. FC Nürnberg, SV Werder Bremen and Viktoria Stolp repeated their 1933–34 Gauliga titles with the remaining five winning their first.

German championship

References

Sources
 kicker-Almanach 1990  Yearbook of German football, publisher: kicker Sportmagazin, published: 1989, 
 100 Jahre Süddeutscher Fußball-Verband  100 Years of the Southern German Football Federation, publisher: SFV, published: 1997
 Die deutschen Gauligen 1933–45 – Heft 1–3  Tables of the Gauligas 1933–45, publisher: DSFS

External links
 Das Deutsche Fussball Archiv  Historic German league tables

1935-36
1
Ger